Dashtab Rural District is a rural district (dehestan) in the Central District of Baft County, Kerman Province, Iran. At the 2006 census, its population was 5,170, in 1,144 families. The rural district has 49 villages.

References 

Rural Districts of Kerman Province
Baft County